The Egyptian Airborne Corps are the airborne infantry units of the Egyptian Army.

History 
The history of the paratroopers in Egypt begins When Egypt's Military Attache in Britain saw how Airborne forces were being established all over the world and how it was very effective during World War 2. The Military Attache suggested the creation of an Egyptian Paratroop Regiment in 1946 and idea was widely welcomed by the High Command of the Armed Forces. Due to the political and economical problems of Egypt at the time, the program of forming a Paratroop unit was halted until 1951.
In 1951,  four army officers were sent to take the airborne course from the United Kingdom and those were First lieutenants Mohammed Atif Abdel Ghaffar, Sobhi Mohammad El Malah, Mohammed Gamal Suleiman and Abdel Qawi Izet Mahgoub the four of them returned back to Egypt in late 1951 and done the first Airborne jump in Egypt's history on July 10, 1952 which was taken as the Airborne's national day. Later many officers started having that Airborne course from UK and the only who took the Rangers course from the US was Saad El Shazly who was sent in 1953 finished the course in 1954 and founded the paratroopers school in the same year where many volunteers entered the school and were trained by the officers who had the Airborne course, in 1955 the 75th Parachute  Battalion was established. Saad El Shazly commanded the first paratrooper battalion in Egypt from 1955 to 1959.

UN Mission 
A UAR parachute battalion was dispatched to the Congo on 9 August 1960, as part of the United Nations Operation in the Congo. It is reported that the battalion in question was the 75th Airborne battalion. The battalion was made up of 350 Egyptians (Four companies) and 150 Syrians (One company), all speaking either French or English, under the command of Saad el-Shazly, though later reports gave the battalion's strength as 550. It was originally announced that the unit was to go to Coquilhatville in the north, but it appears to have spent a significant amount of time at the airport at Léopoldville.

In 1961, the 25th Airborne Brigade was formed becoming Egypt's first Airborne Brigade.

North Yemen Civil War 
During the North Yemeni Civil War in the early 1960s, the 75th Battalion was dispatched to support the Yemeni Republican forces. The battalion's objective was to land and secure Sa'ada which was considered the gateway to the captured capital city of Sana'a. The Paratroopers landed there few hours prior to the Royalist advance. A brutal battle began between the Paratroopers and Royalist forces ultimately leading to the Airborne Battalion successfully defeating the Royalists and securing the area.

Yom Kippur War 
The paratroopers fought in the Yom Kippur War, without conducting any combat drops. Shazli writes that the Army had three parachute brigades at the time. The numbers usually associated with the parachute brigades are 150th, 160th, and 182nd, and Shazli uses two of these designations. Trevor N. Dupuy write the 182nd Parachute Brigade was assigned to Second Army, while 150th and 160th were in GHQ reserve, and Shazli says a brigade moves forward from reserve on or about 17/18 October 1973. Ismalia is a likely location for where the 182nd Brigade fought, and a brigade coming forward from reserve would be consistent with the 150th.

After the Battle of the Chinese Farm, Ismaila was under threat. The 182nd Paratrooper Brigade, comprising the 81st, 85th and 89th Battalions (each composed of three companies) under the command of Colonel Ismail Azmy, was assigned responsibility for defending the area south of Ismailia against an Israeli offensive. Azmy arrived at Nafisha with the bulk of his brigade at midnight on October 17, where he was briefed by Brigadier General Abd el-Munim Khalil, commander of Second Army. Khalil identified the west bank strong points as objectives for the paratroopers to secure, as the ramparts could be used to provide fire support to Egyptian forces on the east bank. The paratroopers would also hold Serabaeum and the bridges there over the Sweetwater Canal.

In the Battle of Ismailia, the combined Egyptian paratrooper-commando (Sai'qa) force managed to achieve a tactical and strategic victory at a time when Egypt's general situation on the battlefield was deteriorating, and GHQ was in a state of confusion. Sharon's advance toward Ismailia had been halted, and Second Army's logistical lines remained secure. According to Dupuy, the Israelis remained about ten kilometers south of Ismailia, now mostly a wrecked city.

Gulf War 
The Paratroopers last major action took place during the Gulf war, where the 170th Airborne Brigade was sent to UAE for protection of the country from possible Iraqi attacks.

Training  
The units hold their 8-week basic jumping group training at the Airborne School, including two weeks of fitness, two weeks of ground training, two weeks of jumping on the wooden and metal towers, and the actual week of jumping. The combatant individual will complete the course after completing 3 to 5 jumps from the plane at a height of 2000 feet
The first stage:

Ground training includes how to stand on the plane's door, how to jump right from the plane, a way to put on a parachute and deal with it after opening in the air, how to control a parachute, how to properly meet the ground, how to separate the parachute after reaching the ground.

The second phase:

It included training to jump from the wooden tower at a height of approximately 34 meters in the first simulation of jumping from the plane. Then jumping from the metal tower, about 80 meters in height, by wearing a basic canopy open from the beginning, which is on the ground, and the tower has a crane that grabs the canopy and raises the jumper to the top of the tower.

third level:

Actual jumping week includes 3 jumps from the C-130 Hercules cargo plane.

If the jumper successfully completes the third stage, he obtains the band and hangs its badge, which is a basic parachute that has two wings. The basic jumping group is obligatory for students of military colleges and attached to parachute units.

Current Structure 
The current structure of the Airborne Corps:

 182nd Airborne Brigade
 HQ Company
 94th Parachute Infantry
 51st Parachute Infantry Battalion 
 38th Parachute Infantry Battalion
 25th Parachute Infantry Battalion
 813rd Parachute Mortar Battalion
 Parachute Anti-Tank Battalion
 Parachute Reconnaissance Company

 170th Airborne Brigade
 HQ Company
 151st Parachute Infantry Battalion
 80th Parachute Infantry Battalion
 73rd Parachute Infantry Battalion
 20th Parachute Infantry Battalion
 240th Parachute Mortar Battalion
 Parachute Anti-Tank Battalion
 Parachute Reconnaissance Company

Support Units
Airborne Anti-Tank Regiment
Airborne Mortar Regiment
Airborne Reconnaissance Battalion
Parachute Maintenance & Cargo Battalion
Training Battalion
 27th Parachute Battalion 'The Bats' (elite)

References

Paratroopers
Paratroopers
Airborne units and formations by country